is a Japanese animation studio established by Satelight's former Osaka studio in 2008.

Animation production

Television
 Princess Lover! (2009)
 Cheburashka Arere? (2009)
 Seitokai Yakuindomo (2010)
 K (2012)
 Coppelion (2013)
 Seitokai Yakuindomo* (2014)
 K: Return of Kings (2015)
 Hand Shakers (2017)
 W'z (2019)
 Project Scard: Scar on the Praeter (2021)

 The Girl I Like Forgot Her Glasses (2023)

 The Masterful Cat Is Depressed Again Today (2023)

Original video animation
 Seitokai Yakuindomo (2011–2013)
 See Me After Class (2012)
 Seitokai Yakuindomo* (2014–2020)
 Hand Shakers: Go ago Go (2017)
 W'z (2019)

Films
 Mardock Scramble: The First Compression (2010)
 Mardock Scramble: The Second Combustion (2011)
 Mardock Scramble: The Third Exhaust (2012)
 K: Missing Kings (2014)
 Seitokai Yakuindomo: The Movie (2017)
 K: Seven Stories (2018, 6-part film series)
 Seitokai Yakuindomo: The Movie 2 (2021)

References

External links 

 
Japanese animation studios
Mass media in Osaka
Mass media companies established in 2008
Japanese companies established in 2008